Mike Olsen (born February 8, 1968) is an American stock car racing driver. He is a two-time champion of the NASCAR K&N Pro Series East. He has also competed in all three NASCAR national touring series.

Personal life
Olsen was born February 8, 1968, and is a native of North Haverhill, New Hampshire. He is the grandson of famed New England racer Stub Fadden.

Career
Olsen is a two-time champion of the NASCAR Busch North Series, winning the championship in 2001 and 2006. He began racing in the series in 1989, and competed in 288 events in the series between then and 2009, scoring six career wins. His sponsor for the majority of his time in the series was Little Trees air fresheners. After the season, he was flagged as the winner of the 2005 Toyota All-Star Showdown over David Gilliland, but in post-race inspection it was discovered that illegal right-side wheels were installed on his car. Olsen was disqualified as a result, with Gilliland being declared the winner.

Olsen has competed in eleven NASCAR Busch Series events, between 1996 and 2000, with the majority being combination races between the Busch and Busch North series; his best finish in Busch Series competition was 18th, at Watkins Glen International in 1997. Olsen also made three starts in the NASCAR Craftsman Truck Series, with two coming in 2001 and one in 2008; his best finish in the series is 29th.

After several years off from NASCAR competition, Olsen returned to the track in 2012, competing in the NASCAR K&N Pro Series West at Portland International Raceway; he started 30th in the 30-car field and finished 24th. In September of that year, Olsen made his debut in NASCAR's top series, the Sprint Cup Series, at New Hampshire Motor Speedway in the Sylvania 300, driving the No. 32 Ford for FAS Lane Racing; he finished 33rd in the event, which he stated was likely to be his one and only race in the series. This is the last time Olsen ran in a NASCAR-sanctioned event.

Motorsports career results

NASCAR
(key) (Bold – Pole position awarded by qualifying time. Italics – Pole position earned by points standings or practice time. * – Most laps led.)

Sprint Cup Series

Busch Series

Olsen had a best finish in the series of 18th and mostly ran for his self-owned team. He DNQ’d often.

Craftsman Truck Series

Camping World East Series

K&N Pro Series West

 Season still in progress
 Ineligible for series points
 Competed only in companion events with Busch North Series as BNS driver and ineligible for Busch Series points

References

External links
 

Living people
1968 births
People from Haverhill, New Hampshire
Racing drivers from New Hampshire
NASCAR drivers